Parukkal  is a village in the Udayarpalayam taluk of Ariyalur district, Tamil Nadu, India.

Demographics 

As per the 2001 census, suthamalli had a total population of 2141 with 1049 males and 1092 females.

References 

Villages in Ariyalur district